The following is a list of American films released in 1947.

Gentleman's Agreement won Best Picture at the Academy Awards.

A-B

C-D

E-F

G-H

I-J

K-L

M-N

O-Q

R-S

T-U

V-Z

Documentary

Serials

Shorts

See also
 1947 in the United States

References

External links

1947 films at the Internet Movie Database

1947
Films
Lists of 1947 films by country or language